Nestor Ohu (born 2 March 1962) is a politician of the Marquesas Islands. He is the mayor of the island of Ua Huka, governing over 592 inhabitants. He was elected in May 2014 for a term of six years until 2020.

References

People from the Marquesas Islands
1962 births
Living people
Mayors of places in French Polynesia